RegexBuddy is a regular expression programming tool by Just Great Software Co. Ltd. for the Microsoft Windows operating system. It provides an interface for building, testing, and debugging regular expressions, in addition to a library of commonly used regular expressions, an interface for generating code to use regular expressions in the desired programming environment, a graphical grep tool for searching through files and directories, and an integrated forum for seeking and providing regular expression advice with other RegexBuddy users.

RegexBuddy's regular expression engine allows the software to emulate the rules and limitations of numerous popular regular expression flavors.

Supported regular expression flavors
15 regular expression flavors are supported as of RegexBuddy 4.1.1.

JGsoft
An engine developed by the company that produces RegexBuddy. The JGsoft flavor is designed as a fusion flavor, and hence supports most syntax from other popular flavors.

.NET
The System.Text.RegularExpressions.Regex class in the .NET Framework, used by programming languages such as C# and Visual Basic .NET.

Java
The regular expression flavor of the  package, available in the JDK 1.4 and later.

Perl
The regular expression flavor used in the Perl programming language version 5.8.

PCRE
Version 10.36 of Philip Hazel's open source Perl Compatible Regular Expressions library, used by PHP/preg and REALbasic.

JavaScript
The regular expression syntax defined in the third edition of ECMA-262, which standardizes JavaScript.

Python
The regular expression flavor supported by Python's built-in re module.

Ruby
The regular expression flavor built into the  programming language.

Tcl ARE
The Tcl Advanced Regular Expressions flavor.

POSIX BRE
POSIX Basic Regular Expressions, defined in the IEEE POSIX regular expression standard.

POSIX ERE
POSIX Extended Regular Expressions, defined in the IEEE POSIX regular expression standard.

GNU BRE
The POSIX BRE flavor with GNU extensions. Used by the GNU implementations of traditional UNIX commands like grep, sed, and awk.

GNU ERE
The POSIX ERE flavor with GNU extensions. Used by the GNU implementations of traditional UNIX commands like grep, sed, and awk.

XML Schema
The regular expression flavor defined in the W3C XML Schema standard.

XPath
The regular expression flavor defined in the W3C XPath standard; used in XPath 2.0, XSLT 2.0 and XQuery 1.0.

RegexBuddy allows generating code for a further extended number of environments, based on the above flavors.

Supported modifiers
Dot matches newline (aka single-line mode, commonly implemented as /s).
Case insensitive (aka ignore case mode, commonly implemented as /i).
^$ match at line breaks (aka multi-line mode, commonly implemented as /m).
Free-spacing (aka extended or free-spacing and comments mode, commonly implemented as /x).

In cases where the selected flavor does not support one or more of the above modifiers, the option is disabled.

Versions
RegexBuddy 1.0 — Released May 3, 2004 — Initial version based on the PCRE library
RegexBuddy 2.0 — Released January 25, 2005 — Added the regular expression debugger, grep functionality, and the new JGsoft regular expression engine
RegexBuddy 3.0 — Released June 13, 2007 — Introduced multi-flavor support (with 12 flavors; expanded in later releases) and the integrated forum
RegexBuddy 4.0 — Released September 16, 2013 — Introduced multi-application support  (with 126 predefined applications, aware of 574 aspects of 94 distinct regular expression flavors, and aware of 96 aspects of 30 replacement flavors)

References

External links
Official RegexBuddy website
Regular-Expressions.info — Regular expression tutorial and reference built from the RegexBuddy help files
Regular expression flavor comparison — Although not officially stated, this list shows flavor-specific syntax and behavior supported by RegexBuddy
 Listing of alternative regular expression tester software

Proprietary software
Pattern matching